"Keep Up" is a song by British YouTuber and rapper KSI  featuring fellow British rapper Jme from the former's debut extended play (EP), of the same name (2016). It was produced by Sway and Show N Prove. The song was released for digital download and streaming on 13 November 2015 by Island Records as the lead single from the EP. The song charted at number 45 in the United Kingdom and also reached the singles charts of Ireland and Australia. An accompanying music video was released on 15 November 2015.

Commercial performance 
The song entered the UK Singles Chart at number 45. It dropped to number 68 and number 91 over the following two weeks, before dropping out of the top 100. In January 2016, the song re-entered the UK Singles Chart at number 69 following the release of the Keep Up EP. The song spent a total of twelve weeks on the UK R&B Singles Chart, peaking at number 7. The song also charted at number 78 on the ARIA Australia Top 100 Singles Chart after the release of the Keep Up EP, making it KSI's first song to chart in Australia.

Music video
The music video, directed by Jack Delaney, was filmed in London in September 2015, as documented in KSI's YouTube vlog titled "New Music Video!", and was uploaded to KSI's YouTube channel on 15 November 2015. It has 40 million views.

Credits and personnel 
Credits adapted from Tidal.

KSI – vocals, songwriter
Jme – vocals, songwriter
Sway – producer, songwriter, engineer
Show N Prove – producer, songwriter
DJ Turkish – engineer, mixer
Oscar Lo Brutto – studio personnel
Nicola Scordellis – additional vocals

Charts

Release history

References 

2015 songs
2015 singles
KSI songs
Jme (musician) songs
Songs written by KSI
Songs written by Sway (musician)
Island Records singles
Universal Music Group singles